Arland Dean Williams Jr. (September 23, 1935 – January 13, 1982) was a passenger aboard Air Florida Flight 90, which crashed on take-off in Washington, D.C., on January 13, 1982, killing 74 people. One of six people to initially survive the crash, he helped the other five escape the sinking plane before he himself drowned.

The 14th Street Bridge over the Potomac River at the crash site was renamed in his honor.

Biography
Born and raised in Mattoon, Illinois, Williams graduated from Mattoon High School in 1953, where he acquired the nickname "Chub". He attended The Citadel in South Carolina. According to his high school girlfriend, Williams had been nervous about The Citadel's swimming requirement, as he had always had a fear of water. 

Williams was the son of A.D. Williams and Virginia Church Williams. He was a divorced father of two - Arland D. Williams III (1966-2003) and Leslie A. Williams, and was engaged to be remarried when he died.

After graduation he served two years in the military in a stateside post and then went into banking, eventually becoming a bank examiner for the Federal Reserve System in Atlanta.

Air Florida Flight 90

On January 13, 1982, during an extraordinary period of freezing weather, Air Florida Flight 90 took off from nearby Washington National Airport, failed to gain altitude, and  crashed into the 14th Street Bridge, where it hit six cars and a truck on the bridge, killing four motorists.

After the crash on the bridge, the plane then continued forward and plunged into the freezing Potomac River.  Soon only the tail section which had broken off remained afloat. Only 6 of the airliner's 79 occupants (74 passengers and 5 crew members) survived the initial crash and were able to escape the sinking plane in the middle of the ice-choked river.

After the crash
News cameramen watched from the bridge, recording the unfolding disaster. There appeared to be no way to reach the survivors in the water. Bystanders helped as fellow passerby Roger Olian, with a makeshift rope, began an attempt to rescue them. At about 4:20 p.m., Eagle 1, a U.S. Park Police helicopter based at Anacostia Park in Washington and flown by pilot Donald W. Usher and carrying paramedic Melvin E. "Gene" Windsor, arrived and assisted with the rescue operation. At one point in the operation the helicopter's skids dipped beneath the surface of the icy water.

According to the other five survivors, Williams continued to help the others reach the rescue ropes being dropped by the hovering helicopter, repeatedly passing the line to others instead of using it himself. While the other five were being taken to shore by the helicopter, the tail section of the wrecked Boeing 737 shifted and sank farther into the water, dragging Williams under the water with it.

The next day, The Washington Post described his actions:  

An essay in Time magazine dated January 25, 1982, was written before the identity of Williams was known. Roger Rosenblatt, the essay's author, wrote:

Legacy
The four other members of the Air Florida rescue who also risked their lives but survived were honored shortly after the disaster.

It took over a year to investigate and establish without any doubt Williams's identity and actions. On June 6, 1983, Williams was posthumously awarded the United States Coast Guard's Gold Lifesaving Medal in a White House Oval Office presentation to his family by President Ronald Reagan and Secretary of Transportation Elizabeth H. Dole. Mrs. Virginia Williams accepted the medal on her son's behalf. Other participants in the ceremony included the recipient's father, Arland; his children, Arland III and Leslie Ann; and his sister, Jean Fullmer. Also present were Commander Donald C. Addison; Vice Admiral Benedict L. Stabile, vice commandant of the U.S. Coast Guard; Senator Charles H. Percy and Representative Daniel B. Crane of Illinois.

The docudrama Flight 90: Disaster on the Potomac was aired on NBC television on April 1, 1984. It displayed the heroism of Williams, portrayed by Donnelly Rhodes.

The repaired 14th Street Bridge over the Potomac River at the crash site, which had been officially named the "Rochambeau Bridge", was renamed the "Arland D. Williams Jr. Memorial Bridge" in his honor by the city government of the District of Columbia in March 1985. Senator Ernest Hollings of South Carolina, a fellow alumnus of the Citadel, initiated the action in late 1983.

In 1993, Reagan retold the story of Williams and paid tribute to him during a commencement address at the Citadel on May 15. In 2000, the Citadel — and Williams's alma mater (class of 1957) — created the Arland D. Williams Society to recognize graduates who distinguished themselves through community service. The Citadel also established the Arland D. Williams Endowed Professorship of Heroism in his honor.

In August 2003, the new Arland D. Williams Jr. Elementary School in his hometown of Mattoon was dedicated.

Pop singer Sara Hickman's song "Last Man in the Water" is a tribute to Williams.

See also

Air Florida Flight 90
Lenny Skutnik

References

External links
Atlas Obscura

1935 births
1982 deaths
Accidental deaths in Washington, D.C.
Deaths by drowning in the United States
People from Atlanta
People from Mattoon, Illinois
Recipients of the Gold Lifesaving Medal
The Citadel, The Military College of South Carolina alumni
Federal Reserve System
Victims of aviation accidents or incidents in 1982
Victims of aviation accidents or incidents in the United States